The Walking Dead: World Beyond is an American post-apocalyptic horror drama limited series created by Scott M. Gimple and Matthew Negrete that premiered on AMC on October 4, 2020. It is a spin-off series to The Walking Dead, which is based on the comic book series of the same name by Robert Kirkman, Tony Moore, and Charlie Adlard, and is the third television series within The Walking Dead franchise. The first season consisted of 10 episodes. The second and final season premiered on October 3, 2021, and also consists of 10 episodes with the final episode aired on December 5, 2021. Matthew Negrete, who previously wrote for The Walking Dead, is the showrunner for the series.

The series received mixed reviews, with critics praising the performances of the cast, but criticizing its pacing.

Premise
The series, set in Nebraska ten years after the zombie apocalypse, features four teenage protagonists and focuses on "the first generation to come-of-age in the apocalypse as we know it. Some will become heroes. Some will become villains. In the end, all of them will be changed forever. Grown-up and cemented in their identities, both good and bad."

The series begins in a college town in Nebraska, which is a reference to the season 2 episode of the original series. The episode, titled "Nebraska", mentions that Nebraska was well-poised to resist the zombie apocalypse because of their low human population density and high level of firearms.

In World Beyond, the "Campus Colony" comes into being when the Nebraska State University campus is declared a safe zone at the beginning of the zombie outbreak. Civilians flee to the campus, which is protected by U.S. military personnel. As the rest of the world descends into chaos, the enclave at Nebraska State University survives and thrives to enable a generation of children to grow up in relative safety. Thus the main characters of World Beyond have lived a pretty sheltered existence and at the start of the series have rarely left the safety of the campus. It is eventually revealed that Omaha is part of the "Alliance of Three", which is an association of three survivor cities: Portland, Omaha and the Civic Republic. In this confederation, the Campus Colony with about 10,000 residents is viewed as a mere satellite branch of the larger Omaha outpost, which has about 100,000 inhabitants.

Cast and characters

Main
 Aliyah Royale as Iris Bennett, a smart high school student and aspiring scientist.
 Alexa Mansour as Hope Bennett, Iris' adoptive, rebellious and intellectual sister.
 Hal Cumpston as Silas Plaskett, a shy teenager who was transferred to the Campus Colony after committing a violent offense.
 Nicolas Cantu as Elton Ortiz, an analytical and intellectual fifteen-year-old.
 Nico Tortorella as Felix Carlucci, the head of security at the Campus Colony, who was kicked out of his house for coming out as gay.
 Annet Mahendru as Jennifer "Huck" Mallick, a security officer at the Campus Colony, who is also Elizabeth's daughter.
 Julia Ormond as Elizabeth Kublek, the lieutenant colonel of the Civic Republic Military (CRM).
 Joe Holt as Leopold "Leo" Bennett, the adoptive father of Iris and Hope, who is a scientist that is being held by the CRM. (season 2; recurring season 1)
 Natalie Gold as Lyla Belshaw, a scientist for the CRM, who is one of Leo Bennett's colleagues. (season 2; recurring season 1)
 Jelani Alladin as Will Campbell, a former security officer at the Campus Colony, who is Felix's boyfriend and later husband. (season 2; guest season 1)
 Ted Sutherland as Percy, Tony's nephew, who was abandoned by his mother and left to Tony. (season 2; recurring season 1)
 Pollyanna McIntosh as Jadis Stokes / Anne, the warrant officer of the CRM who disappeared along with Rick Grimes on the CRM helicopter in The Walking Dead. (season 2)

Recurring
 Christina Marie Karis as Kari Bennett, the adoptive mother of Iris and Hope, who was killed by Amelia at the beginning of the zombie apocalypse. (season 1)
 Anna Khaja as Indira, the leader of the Perimeter, a small community who allies with the Civic Republic. (season 2)
 Robert Palmer Watkins as Frank Newton, the lieutenant of the CRM. (season 2; guest season 1)
 Maximilian Osinski as Dennis Graham, a once dedicated and disciplined master sergeant of the CRM who is now trying to pick up the pieces of his life. He is also Huck's husband. (season 2)
 Madelyn Kientz as Asha, Indira's generous and brave daughter who developed a close bond with Elton. (season 2)
 Gissette Valentin as Diane Pierce, a smart, driven corporal of the CRM who commands the respect of someone in a much higher position of authority. (season 2)
 Al Calderon as Barca, the sergeant major of the CRM, who is also one of Elizabeth's bodyguards. 
 Scott Adsit as Tony Delmado, a traveling magician from Las Vegas, who is Percy's uncle. (season 1)

Guest
 Christina Brucato as Amelia Ortiz, Elton's pregnant mother, who killed Kari at the beginning of the zombie apocalypse, and then was killed by Hope. (season 1)
 Noah Emmerich as Dr. Edwin Jenner, a CDC virologist who had previously appeared in "Wildfire" and "TS-19" of the first season of The Walking Dead. (season 2)

Episodes

Season 1 (2020)

Season 2 (2021)

Production

Development
In July 2018, during San Diego Comic Con, executive producer Scott Gimple announced that a new spin-off was in the works. In April 2019, AMC gave a ten-episode order for the series. In July, the series was given the working title of Monument. On November 24, 2019, Gimple revealed the show's title. In January 2020, alongside the series premiere date announcement, AMC confirmed that the series would only consist of two seasons.

Casting
In July 2019, Alexa Mansour, Nicolas Cantu, and Hal Cumpston were cast as main undisclosed roles. The same month, Aliyah Royale and Annet Mahendru joined the cast. The following month, Nico Tortorella. Julia Ormond was announced as a cast member in November 2019, playing the role of Elizabeth Kublek, the "charismatic leader of a large, sophisticated and formidable force".

In August 2019, Joe Holt was cast in a recurring role. In November, Natalie Gold, Al Calderon, Scott Adsit and Ted Sutherland were cast as Lyla, Barca, Tony and Percy.

In May 2021, Robert Palmer Watkins joined the cast in recurring role for the second season. For the second season, Joe Holt, Jelani Alladin, Natalie Gold and Ted Sutherland were promoted to series regulars.

Filming
Filming for the series began late July 2019 in Richmond, Virginia and was expected to last until November 2019. Jordan Vogt-Roberts was originally announced to be the director of the pilot episode. Vogt-Roberts was replaced with Magnus Martens, who previously directed for Fear the Walking Dead. The change in directors was a result of the writers mapping out the rest of the season and production had to go in a different direction; Negrete said Vogt-Roberts contributed ideas to the first episode. The series was looking to film a plane crash in the vein of Lost with filming to take place in Hopewell, Virginia during the first two weeks of August.

Release

Broadcast
The series was originally set to premiere on April 12, 2020, on AMC, after the tenth season finale of The Walking Dead. However, in March 2020, AMC announced that the premiere was delayed and would instead debut "later this year". On July 24, 2020, it was announced that the series would premiere on October 4, 2020. The series premiered on October 1, 2020, on AMC+, AMC's premium on-demand service and each episode became available three days before their broadcast premiere. The final season premiered on October 3, 2021 on AMC.

Outside the United States, the series is distributed by Amazon Prime Video and first premiered on October 2, 2020.

Marketing
The first trailer was released at New York Comic Con on October 5, 2019. A second trailer was released November 25.

Home media
The first season was released on Blu-ray and DVD on June 15, 2021. The second season was released on Blu-ray and DVD on March 8, 2022.

Reception
The Walking Dead: World Beyond has received mixed reviews from critics. On Rotten Tomatoes, the first season has a score of 46% with an average rating of 4.90/10 based on 24 critics. The website's critical consensus reads: "World Beyonds strong performances and new perspective within The Walking Dead universe aren't enough to make it stand out in an increasingly crowded franchise." On Metacritic, the first season has a score of 48 out of 100 based on 10 critics, indicated "mixed or average reviews".

Daniel D'Addario of Variety gave it a generally positive review and wrote, "This is not a perfect series... And yet there's a willingness to reinvent, to genuinely probe a corner of the universe previously untouched, that makes this series feel serious in its intent and, for fans of the forerunning series, well worth checking out". In a more negative review from Candice Frederick of TV Guide, she graded it two out of five stars and wrote, "World Beyond doesn't offer audiences fresh ideas or even fascinating characters for which to root."

References

External links
 
 

2020s American horror television series
2020s American drama television series
2020 American television series debuts
2021 American television series endings
2020s American LGBT-related drama television series
AMC (TV channel) original programming
American horror fiction television series
American television spin-offs
Gay-related television shows
Horror drama television series
Serial drama television series
Post-apocalyptic television series
Television productions suspended due to the COVID-19 pandemic
Television series about teenagers
Television series based on Image Comics
Television shows set in Nebraska
Walking Dead: World Beyond, The
Zombies in television